Lucky in Love: The Best of Rick Vito is a compilation album by former Fleetwood Mac guitarist Rick Vito. Released in 2009, the album features songs from Vito's solo career starting in 1992.

Track listing
"Mr. Lucky"
"Walk Another Mile"
"Desiree"
"Blues Town"
"Little Sheba"
"Rhumba Diablo"
"I Do Believe"
"I Loved Another Woman"
"Homework"
"Feels Just Like Home"
"Long Black Car"
"Meet Me at Midnight"
"Everybody Gets Lucky Sometimes"
"Exotica by Night"
"Rattlesnake Shake"
"Black Crow Blues"
"Love Is Dangerous"
"Talk That Talk"
"A Change Is Gonna Come"

References

2009 greatest hits albums
Rick Vito albums